Anna Mae Flynn is an ultrarunner and ultrarunning coach based in Lake Tahoe, California. Flynn was the female winner of the 2017 and 2019 Speedgoat 50k.

Race Results 

2017 
 Quad Rock 50 miler May 13, 2017 - 3rd Female (7th overall), 8:40:23
 The Broken Arrow Skyrace 52k June 17, 2017 - 3rd Female (22nd overall), 6:08:09
 Speedgoat 50k July 29, 2017 - 1st Female (10th overall), 6:18:04

2019 
 Lake Sonoma 50 miler April 13, 2019 - 1st Female (14th overall), 7:25:15
 Speedgoat 50k July 20, 2019 - 1st Female (15th overall), 6:30:15

References

Living people
Year of birth missing (living people)
People from Avery County, North Carolina
American female marathon runners
Sportspeople from North Carolina
21st-century American women